Alam Reg Railway Station (Balochi: عالم ریگ ریلوے اسٹیشن) is located in Alam Reg, Balochistan, Pakistan.

See also
 List of railway stations in Pakistan
 Pakistan Railways

References

Railway stations on Quetta–Taftan Railway Line
Railway stations in Balochistan, Pakistan